Multisporidea is a fungal genus in the family Malmideaceae. It is monotypic, containing the single species Multisporidea nitida, a corticolous lichen found in Réunion. The species was described as new to science in 2021 by lichenologists Klaus Kalb and André Aptroot. The lichen has a dull, whitish to pale pinkish-brown thallus that is sometimes bordered by a black hypothallus measuring up to 0.3 mm wide. The specific epithet nitida refers to the glossy apothecia, while the generic name alludes to the multi-spored asci. The lichen is unreactive to standard chemical spot tests, and no lichen substances are detected with thin-layer chromatography.

References

Malmideaceae
Lichen species
Taxa described in 2021
Taxa named by André Aptroot
Taxa named by Klaus Kalb
Monotypic Lecanorales genera